Syllepte torsipex is a moth in the family Crambidae. It was described by George Hampson in 1898. It is found in Democratic Republic of the Congo, Ivory Coast, Sierra Leone and in Zambia.

References
Hampson, G. F. 1899a. A revision of the moths of the subfamily Pyraustinae and family Pyralidae, part 1. - Proceedings of the Zoological Society of London 1898(4):715, pl. 49 (XLIX)–fig.12

Insects of the Democratic Republic of the Congo
Insects of West Africa
Moths described in 1898
Moths of Africa
torsipex
Taxa named by George Hampson